Abijah is a person named in the Old Testament. She was the daughter of a Zechariah, possibly Zechariah the son of Jeberechiah (2 Chronicles 29:1; compare Book of Isaiah 8:2), and afterwards the wife of King Ahaz (reigned c. 732 - 716 BCE) and mother of King Hezekiah (reigned c. 715-686 BCE). She is also called Abi (2 Kings 18:2).

Some writers consider Abijah to be the almah or "young woman" (at the time of the prophecy) in the Immanuel prophecy in Isaiah 7:14, and that the child who will be an infant when Rezin and Pekah are defeated by Tiglath-Pileser III (reigned 745–727 BCE) may be the future heir, Hezekiah.

References

8th-century BCE Hebrew people
8th-century BC women
Davidic line
Jewish royalty
Queen mothers
Women in the Hebrew Bible
Queens consort of Israel and Judah
Books of Chronicles people
Book of Isaiah people
House of Pekah